Aleksandr Martynov may refer to:

Aleksandr Martynov (Russian politician) (1865–1935), member of the Menshevik movement
Aleksandr Martynov (Transnistrian politician), Prime Minister since December 2016
Aleksandr Nikolayevich Martynov (1892–1956), Russian footballer

See also
 Martynov